Narmadapuram Lok Sabha constituency is one of the 29 Lok Sabha constituencies in Madhya Pradesh state in central India. This constituency presently covers the entire Narmadapuram district and parts of Narsinghpur and Raisen districts.

Assembly segments
Presently, since the delimitation of the parliamentary and legislative assembly constituencies in 2008, Narmadapuram Lok Sabha constituency comprises the following eight Vidhan Sabha (Legislative Assembly) segments:

Members of Parliament

Election Results

See also
 Narmadapuram district
 List of Constituencies of the Lok Sabha

References

External links
Narmadapuram lok sabha  constituency election 2019 result details

Lok Sabha constituencies in Madhya Pradesh
Hoshangabad district